Donald Reynolds Crane, Jr. (born February 5, 1934) is an American former politician in the state of Florida.

Crane was born in Summit, New Jersey. An insurance executive, he is an alumnus of the University of North Carolina. He served as a Republican in the Florida House of Representatives from 1973 to 1974, representing the 61st district. He previously briefly served the 52nd district in 1971.

References

Living people
1934 births
Republican Party members of the Florida House of Representatives